Food preferences in older adults and seniors take into consideration how people's dietary experiences change with aging, and help people understand how taste, nutrition, and food choices can change throughout one's lifetime.  This can occur when people approach the age of 70 or older.  Influencing variables can include: social and cultural environment, gender and/or personal habits, and also physical and mental health. Scientific studies have been performed to attempt to explain why people like or dislike certain foods and what factors may affect these preferences.

The Science of Food Preferences 

Research is continuously examining the variables that cause the elderly to change food preferences: an example being the Elderly Nutrition Program (ENP). The ENP explored how food preferences varied depending on biological sex and ethnic groups in an attempt to improve the quality of meal programs. A total of 2,024 participants in the ENP aged 60 years or older were interviewed. A majority of the participants were female, served by congregate meal programs, or meals served in community settings such as senior centers, churches, or senior housing communities.

A general impression of the meals and preferences for 13 food groups (fresh fruit, chicken, soup, salad, vegetables, potatoes, meat, sandwiches, pasta, canned fruit, legumes, deli meats, and ethnic foods) were and are being assessed. After adjusting for variables, older male subjects were found to be significantly more likely to prefer deli meats, meat, legumes, canned fruit, and ethnic foods compared to females. In addition, compared with African Americans, the study found that "... Caucasians demonstrated higher percentages of preference for 9 of 13 food groups including pasta, meat, and fresh fruit", and recommended that "... To improve the quality of the ENP, and to increase dietary compliance of the older adults to the programs, the nutritional services require a strategic meal plan that solicits and incorporates older adults' food preferences".

Influences on Food Preference 
There are multiple factors in an elderly person's life that can affect food preferences. Aspects like their environment, mental and physical health, and lifestyle choices can all contribute to the individual taste and/or habits of elderly persons.

An article about Influences On Cognitive Function In Older Adults (Neuropsychology, November 2014) states that "the nutritional status of older adults relates to their quality of life, ability to live independently, and their risk for developing costly chronic illnesses. An ageing adult’s nutritional well-being can be affected by multiple socio-environmental factors, including access to healthy and affordable foods, congregate meal sites, and nutritious selections at restaurants. The Academy of Nutrition and Dietetics, American Society for Nutrition, and the Society for Nutrition Education have identified an older adult's access to a balanced diet to be critical for the prevention of disease and promotion of nutritional wellness so that quality of life and independence can be maintained throughout the ageing process and excessive health care costs can be reduced".

Younger vs. Older Adults
Taste buds, a person's needs of certain vitamins and nutrients, and their desire for different types of food can change throughout a person's life. In a study by the Monell Chemical Senses Center, fifty young adults and forty-eight elderly adults participated in the study. "Young" subjects ranged from eighteen to thirty-five years of age and "elderly" subjects were defined as sixty-five years of age or older. There were more females than males in the study, but there were approximately equal proportions of males and females in the two age groups.

The study observed that younger females had stronger cravings for sweets than elderly females. Causation theories included accounting for this difference in preference with the younger female test subject's menstrual cycles and the fact that elderly women no longer go through menopause. The study also postulated that "... Ninety-one percent of the cycle-associated cravings were said to occur in the second half of the cycle (between ovulation and the start of menstruation)".

These physical changes can be considered when assessing why someone of an older age might not be getting the nutrition they need. As taste buds change with age, certain foods might not be seen as appetizing. For example, a study done by Dr. Phyllis B. Grzegorczyk says that as people age, their sense for tasting salty foods slowly goes away.

Male vs. Female 

There are differences in food preferences between biological sexes. In a study conducted by the ENP, preferences of male and female subjects throughout 13 individual food groups (fresh fruit, chicken, soup, salad, vegetables, potatoes, meat, sandwiches, pasta, canned fruit, legumes, deli meats, and ethnic groups) were identified.

Through this study, it was apparent that older males were "significantly more likely to prefer deli meats, meat, legumes, canned fruit, and ethnic foods compared to females".

Another study by the Monell Chemical Senses Center concluded that females had significantly more cravings for sweets and for chocolate than males; and the study results suggested that males had more cravings or preferences for entrees than sweets.

Personal Health

Physical health 

With age, some people avoid food or are unwilling to modify their diets due to oral health problems. These issues, such as ill-fitting dentures (false teeth) or gum disease, are associated with significant differences in dietary quality, which is a measure of the quality of the diet using a total of eight recommendations regarding the consumption of foods and nutrients from the National Academy of Sciences (NAS). Approaches to minimize food avoidance and promote changes to the diets of people that have eating difficulties due to oral health conditions are needed desperately because without being able to chew or take in food properly, their health is affected dramatically and their food preferences are limited greatly (to soft or liquids only).

Due to varying factors of older adults' physical and mental wellbeing, eating choices can become more restricted. Many elderly people are forced into eating softer foods, foods that incorporate fiber and protein, drinking calcium-packed liquids, and so on. Six of the leading causes of death for older adults, including cardiovascular disease, cancer, chronic lower respiratory disease, stroke, Alzheimer's disease, and diabetes mellitus, have nutrition-related causes and/or respond favorably to nutrition interventions. These six illnesses can implement certain restrictions and heavily influence the diet of elderly persons.

Declines in physical health can also cause deterioration in diet due to difficulties in preparing and eating food as a result of conditions like arthritis.

At the 2010 "Providing Healthy and Safe Foods As We Age" conference sponsored by the Institute of Medicine, Dr. Katherine Tucker noted that the elderly are less active and have lower metabolism with a consequent lower need to eat.  In addition, they tend to have existing diseases and/or take medications that interfere with nutrient absorption. Based on their research dietary requirements, one study developed a modified food pyramid for adults over 70.

Carbohydrates for improving the cognitive performance of independent-living older adults with normal cognition or mild cognitive impairment

There is currently limited evidence to form a strong conclusion to recommend the use of any form of carbohydrate in preventing or reducing cognitive decline in older adults with normal cognition or mild cognitive impairment. So, more evidence is needed to evaluate memory improvement and find nutritional issues due to carbohydrates.

Mental health 

The impact of certain diseases can also impact the quality of the food in the elderly population, especially those that are in care facilities. Certain risk factors include conditions that impair cognitive function, such as dementia. When a person falls victim to a condition that limits mental capacity, mortality risk can rise if due care is not implemented.

As a result of certain mental health conditions and/or diseases—like Alzheimer's disease—a person's food preferences might become affected. With certain diseases, individuals can develop specific preferences or distaste for various types of food that were not present before onset. For example, people with Alzheimer's disease may experience many big and small changes as a result of their symptoms. One change identified by Suszynski in "How Dementia Tampers With Taste Buds" is within the taste buds of a patient with dementia, which contain the receptors for taste. Since the experience of flavor is significantly altered, people with dementia can often change their eating habits and take on entirely new food preferences. In this study, the researchers found that these dementia patients had trouble identifying flavors and appeared to have lost the ability to remember tastes, therefore leading to a theory that dementia caused the patients to lose their knowledge of flavors.

Psychological conditions can also affect elderly eating habits.  For instance, the length of widowhood may affect nutrition. Depression in elderly people is also associated with a risk of malnutrition.

Lifestyle Choices 
Elderly people, like all people, have different lifestyle choices involved in their eating habits. Dietary choices are often a result of personal beliefs and preferences.

A survey based on self-reporting found that many rural community-dwelling elderly Iowans adopted eating habits that provided inadequate levels of some key nutrients and most did not take supplements to correct the deficiencies.  In contrast, a restaurant study found that the impact of a lifestyle of health and sustainability on healthy food choices is much stronger for senior diners than for non-senior diners.

Other research has found that adults, regardless of age, will tend to increase fruit and vegetable consumption following a diagnosis of breast, prostate or colorectal cancer.

Social Environment and Conditioning 

The environment can greatly impact food the preferences of older adults.  Those around 75 years old and older are more likely to suffer with limited mobility due to health conditions and often rely on others for food shopping and preparation.

In some areas, homebound seniors receive one meal per day (several fresh and frozen meals may be included in a single delivery) by communities that offer congregate meals, or meals served in community settings such as senior centers, churches or senior housing communities. These congregate meal programs are encouraged to offer these elderly people a meal at least five times per week.

Impeded access to transportation may also be an issue for elderly persons, especially in rural areas where there is less public transportation. This can vary greatly due to geographic location; for instance, an Iowa-based study failed to find problems in purchasing food among elderly in rural open country and towns, as those without their own transportation relied on family, friends and senior services.  A separate study found a slight difference in urban areas with elderly who did not own a car.  Aside from transportation, the kind and quality of available food can also shape food choice if a person lives in a so-called "food desert".

Social network type can also affect individuals food choices in our elderly population. For example, one study showed that a person that has a larger social network and lower economic status is more likely to have proper nutrition that someone who has a smaller social network and higher economic status. Health and social aid can be instrumental into introducing positive change for those at risk.

See also 

Assisted living
Centenarian
Elderly care
Food choice
Food studies
Illnesses related to poor nutrition
List of nutrition guides
Meals on Wheels
Nutrition
Portion size
Research into centenarians
Tea and toast syndrome

References 

Old age
Geriatrics
Eating behaviors of humans